Grand Boulevard is a major, seven to five-lane wide, north-south thoroughfare that runs through the center of St. Louis, Missouri. It runs north through Carondelet Park in the south portion of the city to the Mississippi River north of the McKinley Bridge, about midway between Forest Park and the Mississippi River. Neighborhoods that it runs through include Dutchtown, Tower Grove East, Tower Grove South, Compton Heights, Tiffany, Midtown, Jef-Vander-Lou, Fairground, and College Hill.

Mass-transit connections
Grand Boulevard connects with the St. Louis Metrolink light rail service at Grand Station. The station was closed in spring 2011 due to demolition and replacement of the viaduct on Grand spanning the Metrolink tracks, industrial train tracks, and an industrial park. The project is expected to take 18-24 months and will include the replacement of the Grand Avenue station. As of August 20, 2012, the new larger metro and bus station and viaduct with wider pedestrian sidewalks is open.

Grand Blvd also has the 70 Grand MetroBus, the busiest bus route in the St. Louis area. The route number comes from a streetcar line that previously operated on track in the center lane of Grand Boulevard with that number.

Places on Grand Boulevard

Sportsman's Park
Fairground Park
Divoli Branch library
St. Alphonse's Liguori Catholic Church
Saint Louis University
Fox Theatre
Grand Center
Compton Hill Reservoir Park, site of the landmark Compton Hill Water Tower
Carpenter Branch library
Tower Grove Park, site of the annual Festival of Nations
Saint Louis University School of Medicine
Saint Louis University Hospital
SSM Cardinal Glennon Children's Hospital
Carondelet Park
St. Mary's High School
Pevely Dairy Company Plant
Pius XII Memorial Library
Powell Hall
Cupples House
Ted Drewes, the Grand location of the locally famous Frozen custard stands
Edward Adelbert Doisy Research Center
KDHX 88.1 FM community radio, located directly off of Grand Boulevard
Missouri School for the Blind, located off of Grand Blvd, the first school to adopt the Braille alphabet in America, and a teacher invented the first Braille printing press
 Grand Avenue Water Tower, the older Corinthian water tower in North St. Louis

References

Streets in St. Louis